Edward Frisbie House may refer to:

Edward Frisbie House (Redding, California), listed on the National Register of Historic Places in Shasta County, California
Edward Frisbie House (Branford, Connecticut), listed on the National Register of Historic Places in New Haven County, Connecticut
Edward Frisbie Homestead, Branford, Connecticut, listed on the National Register of Historic Places in New Haven County, Connecticut